Olle Gällmo (born 26 June 1966) is a Swedish musician and riksspelman, known for his work in playing and promoting the säckpipa, or traditional Swedish bagpipe.

Musical activities 
In 1991 Gällmo began researching the Swedish säckpipa (native bagpipe) tradition, and has since become one of the instrument's most vocal proponents in Sweden and abroad, through concerts, courses, workshops, lectures, and a comprehensive website covering the instrument.

Gällmo plays both the traditional mouthblown single-drone säckpipa, as well as a modernised variant featuring bellows and multiple drones.  The latter instrument is more flexible, allowing him to play his pipes in wider contexts, and to sing along with his own accompaniment.  Gällmo also plays medieval and Renaissance music.

Academic career
Gällmo is licentiate and lecturer in computer science, particularly artificial intelligence, at Uppsala University.

Discography 
 Double Yolks, Duo Gällmo Branschke (2019)
Olle Gällmo - med pipan i säcken (2008)

Bibliography
An Introduction to Neurocomputer Design (1991)

Awards 
 Silver Zorn Medal  - riksspelman 2008

Groups 
Celsiustrion
Härfågel
Joculatores Upsalienses
Zenner&Greiner

References

External links 
 Gallmo's site on the sackpipa
 Olle Gällmo on MySpace

Riksspelmän
Swedish folk musicians
Swedish folk singers
1966 births
Living people
Säckpipa players